Mahle Behr GmbH & Co. KG is a German corporation active in the automobile industry, headquartered in Stuttgart-Feuerbach. It is a specialist for automotive air conditioning and engine cooling systems. In 2006 group sales was €3.2 billion and it employed 18,600 staff.

Mahle Behr has major U.S. operations in Troy, Michigan, Dayton, Ohio (Behr Dayton Thermal Products), Charleston, South Carolina, Fort Worth, Texas.

References

External links
 

Manufacturing companies based in Stuttgart
Auto parts suppliers of Germany
Privately held companies of Germany
Manufacturing companies established in 1905
1905 establishments in Germany